WISK-FM (98.7 FM) is a radio station airing a country music format. Licensed to Americus, Georgia, United States, the station serves the Albany area.  The station is currently owned by Sumter Broadcasting Co., Inc. and features programming from ABC Radio. Its studios and transmitter are in Americus.

The WISK call sign has been used by other broadcasters, including a short-lived station of the late 1950s in Minneapolis-St. Paul, Minnesota, now known as WREY.

References

External links

ISK
Radio stations established in 1978
ISK
1978 establishments in Georgia (U.S. state)